Rhapsody (Rachel Argosy) is a mutant supervillainess appearing in American comic books published by Marvel Comics. She first appeared in X-Factor #79.

Fictional character biography
Rachel Argosy was a teacher, until, at age twenty, her hair and skin turned light blue when her mutant powers developed. Despite being popular with the children, who nicknamed her Rhapsody, the parents complained about having an obvious mutant teacher and, after a meeting of the school board, was fired. (v1 #79)

Two days later, while trying to use her power to convince Harry Sharp, the leader of her detractors on the school board, to reverse its decision, he died of a heart attack while in ecstasy from her power. While fleeing from the police, she stole a violin and used the music from it to fuel her power of flight. The police then called X-Factor, who sent Quicksilver and Jamie Madrox to help capture her. (v1 #79)

While Quicksilver helped bring her down and smashed her violin, she influenced the core Madrox with a flute, who, after his duplicates helped stop her, became angered and convinced Quicksilver to help him break her out. However, when she admitted to Madrox that Sharp had died, albeit not deliberately, at her hands, he rejected her angrily and returned her to prison (v1 #79).
 
She is emotionally dependent on music and becomes depressed after an extended period without hearing it.

She most recently serenaded the attendees of the Hellfire Gala (Marauders 21).

Powers and abilities
While music is playing in the vicinity - usually through her playing her own violin - she can fly and warp minds to manipulate emotions, induce hallucinations in others, or control minds completely - though some are more susceptible than others. Rhapsody retains her powers post-M-Day.

She is a talented violinist and flute player.

References

Appearances
X-Factor v1 #79-81 (Marvel Comics; June 1992 - August 1992)
X-Men: The 198 Files (Marvel Comics; 2006)

External links
Marvel Appendix entry on Rhapsody
UncannyXmen.net Character Profile on Rhapsody

Marvel Comics supervillains
Fictional schoolteachers
Fictional musicians
Marvel Comics mutants

Marvel Comics telepaths
Characters created by Peter David